Félix Delgado (born 5 February 1949) is a Cuban fencer. He competed in the individual and team sabre events at the 1968 Summer Olympics.

References

1949 births
Living people
Cuban male fencers
Olympic fencers of Cuba
Fencers at the 1968 Summer Olympics